Eupithecia molestissima is a moth in the family Geometridae. It is found in China (Yunnan).

References

Moths described in 1981
molestissima
Moths of Asia